Robert Gray Murray (born March 2, 1936) is considered by some to be Canada's foremost abstract  sculptor. He also has been called the most important sculptor of his generation worldwide. His large outdoor works are said to resemble the abstract stabile style of Alexander Calder,  that is, the self-supporting, static, abstract sculptures, dubbed "stabiles" by Jean Arp in 1932 to differentiate them from Calder's mobiles. Murray focused on "trying to get sculpture back to its essential form", he has said. His work is like colour-field abstraction.

Biography
Born in Vancouver, British Columbia, and raised in Saskatoon, Saskatchewan, he has lived in the United States since 1960. He began his career as a painter, studying at the Regina College School of Art (1956-1956). In 1957 he worked at the city planning office in Saskatoon and it commissioned a fountain sculpture from him: it was his first sculpture. He went to study at the Allende Institute, San Miguel de Allende, Mexico (1958-1959), then worked at Saskatoon Technical Collegiate before attending an Emma Lake Artist's Workshop in 1959 with Barnett Newman with whom he formed a lifelong friendship. Newman looked at his paintings and asked "Have you ever thought of sculpture?" He moved to New York City in 1960 on a Canada Council grant, and although he had never studied sculpture in the formal sense, began to produce modernist, elegant, brightly colored welded-metal constructions.

Murray's works often recall natural themes through shape, color, and of course, name; other works are named after people, places, or things in North America though of course, as Murray said:"With abstract art the piece is itself and what happens within the piece is the subject of the piece".

Murray's earliest sheet-metal sculptures were large-scale upright columnar configurations that were made by cutting and bending steel plates to form angles and corners. They were coloured with industrial finishes and created with the aid of fabricators. In 1974, Murray's sculptures became more freely formed than before, with more crenellated surfaces. Murray had a new concern with highly fluid curves that combined complexity of form with subtler colour. His ambition was to incorporate colour as a part of the metal.

Murray usually works to an architectural scale in his sculptures; they have no content but form. They can be viewed as belonging to a past aesthetic - Modernism - and lacking in contemporary relevance. But a reviewer of a recent show, Models, Paintings and Sculpture, much of it completed in the last three years, at Studio 21 Fine Art, Halifax, wrote that, when well executed, a Modernist like Murray can still make objects that achieve a "clarity and sureness that is somehow comforting".

Work in Collections

United States
Alaska

Nimbus, 1978, Alaska State Museum, Juneau

California

Chinook, 1968, Berkeley Art Museum, University of California, Berkeley

Delaware

Sioux, 1984, Delaware Art Museums, Wilmington

District of Columbia

Marker, 1964-1965, Hirshhorn Museum and Sculpture Garden, Washington

Georgia

Montauk, 1967, Adams Park Library, Atlanta,

Illinois

Windhover, 1970, Hinsdale Junior High School, Hinsdale
Maine
Pointe-au-baril III, 1995, collection of Cynthia Stroud, Brooklin

Massachusetts

Quinnipiac, 1974, University Gallery, University of Massachusetts, Amherst
and Drawing after Quinnipiac, Seven Views, 1975, University Gallery, University of Massachusetts, Amherst

Michigan

Nordkyn, 1973-4, Ferry Mall, Wayne State University, Detroit
Windhover, 1976, Grand Rapids Art Museum, Grand Rapids
Minnesota

Taku, 1976, Honeywell Plaza, Minneapolis
Track, 1965, Walker Art Center, Minneapolis

Nebraska

Nanticoke, 1980, Sheldon Memorial Art Gallery and Sculpture Garden, Lincoln

New Jersey

Hillary, 1983, Grounds for Sculpture, Hamilton
Agulapak, 1974, New Jersey State Museum, Trenton

New York

Chilkat, 1977, Metropolitan Museum, New York
Megan's Red, SUNY, Fredonia
Kiana, 1978, Storm King, Mountainville
Spinnaker, 1979, JPMorgan Chase Art Collection, New York
Siwash, Vassar Art Gallery, Vassar College, Poukeepsie
Shawanagan. 1968,  Everson Museum of Art, Syracuse, New York
Spring, 1965, Whitney Museum of American Art, New York

Ohio

Wasahaban/Claire, 1978, Columbus Museum of Art, Columbus

Pennsylvania

Saginaw, 1979, collection of the artist, West Grove, Pennsylvania
Mandan, 1985, collection of the artist, West Grove, Pennsylvania
Palestina, 1985, collection of the artist, West Grove, Pennsylvania
Pattern, 1993-1996, collection of the artist, West Grove, Pennsylvania
Pointe-au-baril II, 1995, collection of the artist, West Grove, Pennsylvania
Bethany, 1981, collection of W. Dixon Stroud, West Grove, Pennsylvania
Lillooet, 1985, collection of W. B. Dixon Stroud, West Grove, Pennsylvania

Wisconsin

Windfall, 1966, Lynden Sculpture Garden, Milwaukee

International

Canada

Alberta

Dyad, 1967, University of Alberta, Edmonton

British Columbia

Skagway, 1977, Kelowna Art Gallery, Kelowna
Cumbria, 1966, University of British Columbia, Vancouver
La Guardia, 1968 Vancouver Art Gallery, Vancouver
Ceres, 1962 , J. A. and Mary Pyrch Collection, Victoria
Juneau, 1977, Art Gallery of Greater Victoria, Victoria
Kennebec, 1978, Art Gallery of Greater Victoria, Victoria
Oneida, 1978, Art Gallery of Greater Victoria, Victoria
Hillary, 1983, serigraph, Art Gallery of Greater Victoria, Victoria
Lennon Yellow, 1980, Art Gallery of Greater Victoria, Victoria

Ontario
TO, 1963, Art Gallery of Ontario, Toronto
Swing, 1974, Art Gallery of Ontario, Toronto
 Ferus, 2001, Pointe au Baril
Kawaatebiishing, 2003, Pointe au Baril
Pointe au Baril II, 2003, Pointe au Baril
Gap, 1973, Canada Council Art Bank, Ottawa
Huron, 1974, Canada Council Art Bank, Ottawa
Juneau, 1976, Canada Council Art Bank, Ottawa
Prairie, 1965–66, Canada Council Art Bank, Ottawa
Roll, 1973, Canada Council Art Bank, Ottawa
Sitka, 1976, Canada Council Art Bank, Ottawa
Split, 1973, Canada Council Art Bank, Ottawa
Togiak, 1974, Canada Council Art Bank, Ottawa
Tundra (for Barnett Newman), 1972-3, Carleton University, Ottawa
Haida, 1973, Dept. of External Affairs, Ottawa
Adam and Eve, 1962-3, National Gallery of Canada, Ottawa
Arroyo, 1968, National Gallery of Canada, Ottawa
Breaker, 1965, National Gallery of Canada, Ottawa
Burwash, 1970, ed. of 17, National Gallery of Canada, Ottawa
Caldwell, 1973, lithograph, National Gallery of Canada, Ottawa
Chilcotin, 1969, National Gallery of Canada, Ottawa
Untitled, 1969, National Gallery of Canada, Ottawa  
Working Model for "Fountain Sculpture" 1959, National Gallery of Canada, Ottawa and Drawing for Fountain Sculpture, National Gallery of Canada, Ottawa 
Trent Series I-10, 1981, National Gallery of Canada, Ottawa 
Lillooet, 2007, Snug Harbor
Mbishkaad]/To Ascend, 2004, One King West, Toronto
Becca's H, 1973, University of Toronto, Toronto
Cascade, 1983, University College art collection, University of Toronto, Toronto
Charybdis, 1962, Paul and Dinah Arthur, Toronto
Ferus, 1963, Paul and Dinah Arthur, Toronto
Lazarus 1961-2, Estate of Marie Fleming, Toronto
Mesa (1967) Mr. and Mrs. David Mirvish, Toronto
Arthabaska, 1966-1967, Gallery Stratford, Stratford, Ontario

New Brunswick

Nunc Dimittis, New Brunswick Museum,  St. John

Saskatchewan

Rainmaker, 1959–60, Saskatoon City Hall, Saskatoon
Study for Saskatoon, 1976, Mendel Art Gallery, Saskatoon

Not Located
Chief (1964)
Bank (1968)
Teal (1969)
Garnet (1974)
Magnetawan (1974)
Tikchik (1974)
Kodiak (1975)
Seward (1976)
Willow (1976)
Alagash, 1978
Chesapeake (1980)
Spinnaker (1980)
Susquehana (1980)
Pointe au Baril IX (2003)
No Exit (2004)
Ferus (model B) (2008)

References

Bibliography

External links
Robert Murray: Sculpture
Robert Murray fonds at the National Gallery of Canada, Ottawa, Ontario

1936 births
Living people
Artists from Vancouver
Canadian male sculptors
20th-century Canadian sculptors
Canadian abstract artists
20th-century Canadian male artists